The granite night lizard (Xantusia henshawi) is a species of xantusiid lizard endemic to North America.

Etymology
The specific name, henshawi, is in honor of American naturalist Henry Wetherbee Henshaw.

Geographic range
X. henshawi is found in Mexico in the Mexican state of Baja California, and also in the United States in adjacent southern California.

Description
X. henshawi is flat-bodied with a broad, flat head and a soft skin. It has rounded, dark dorsal spots on a pale yellow or cream background. Its scales are granular on its dorsum, but large and squarish on the ventral surface. These lizards have large eyes with vertical pupils, and they lack eyelids.

Habitat and behavior
Granite night lizards are often found on rocky slopes with large exfoliating boulders and abundant crevices, but are occasionally found in coastal sage scrub and chaparral without boulders. They are active in crevices during the day, but move on the surface at night.

See also
 California coastal sage and chaparral ecoregion

References

Further reading
Smith HM, Brodie ED Jr (1982). Reptiles of North America: A Guide to Field Identification. New York: Golden Press. 240 pp. . (Xantusia henshawi, pp. 84–85).
Stebbins RC (2003). A Field Guide to Western Reptiles and Amphibians, Third Edition. The Peterson Field Guide Series ®. Boston and New York: Houghton Mifflin Company. 533 pp. . (Xantusia henshawi, p. 306 + Plate 35 + Map 77).
Stejneger L (1893). "Diagnosis of a new California lizard". Proceedings of the United States National Museum 16: 467. (Xantusia henshawi, new species).

Granite night lizard
Fauna of the California chaparral and woodlands
Reptiles of the United States
Reptiles of Mexico
Reptiles described in 1893
Taxa named by Leonhard Stejneger